"Gospel for a New Century" is a song by American musician, Yves Tumor. The song is the lead single off of Tumor's fourth studio album, Heaven to a Tortured Mind. The song was released on February 18, 2020 through Warp.

The title is based on the Japanese title for the anime Neon Genesis Evangelion (Shinseiki Evangerion, literally "New Century Gospel"); the title card in the music video is stylized similarly to the series' episode cards.

Critical reception 
"Gospel for a New Century" was well received by contemporary music critics. Hubert Adjei-Kontoh, writing for Pitchfork, designated the track as "Best New Music", saying that the song start with "a sunny strummed melody" that "narrates the initial coupling, while the impending collapse is represented by a horn and drum sample that could be a Donuts interlude."

KRCW-TV gave "Gospel for a New Century" the "Best New Track" designation describing the song as "balancing chaos and restraint, Yves Tumor cuts deep on "Gospel for a New Century." It serves as a springboard into the next phase of his artistic expression."

References

External links 
 

2020 singles
2020 songs
Yves Tumor songs